Amelia Street Historic District is a national historic district located at Orangeburg, Orangeburg County, South Carolina. The district encompasses 15 contributing buildings in a residential section of Orangeburg. They include residences constructed between 1890 and 1929, and distinguished by large, two-story, frame houses with Victorian decorative woodwork.

It was added to the National Register of Historic Places in 1985.

References

Houses on the National Register of Historic Places in South Carolina
Historic districts on the National Register of Historic Places in South Carolina
Victorian architecture in South Carolina
Houses in Orangeburg County, South Carolina
National Register of Historic Places in Orangeburg County, South Carolina